The Capital Crescent Trail (CCT) is a , shared-use rail trail that runs from Georgetown in Washington, D.C., to Bethesda, Maryland. An extension of the trail from Bethesda to Silver Spring along a route formerly known as the Georgetown Branch Trail is being built as part of the Purple Line light rail project.

The Capital Crescent Trail, one of the most heavily used rail trails in the United States, serves more than 1 million walkers, joggers, bikers, skateboarders and rollerbladers each year.  In 2005, it was named one of the "21 great places that show how transportation can enliven a community" by The Project for Public Spaces.

History

Pre-construction 
The trail runs on the abandoned right-of-way of the Georgetown Branch of the Baltimore and Ohio Railroad.  Partially built in 1892 and completed in 1910, the branch line served the Potomac Electric Power Company (PEPCO), the Washington Mill, and federal government buildings, but became obsolete as Georgetown's waterfront changed. Ten years after the Chessie System bought the B&O in 1973, the railroad announced that it would ask the Interstate Commerce Commission to allow it to abandon the Georgetown Branch. Within a year, the Washington Area Bicyclist Association contacted the Maryland National Capital Parks and Planning Commission about turning it into a trail—an idea perhaps first proposed in the 1975 Bethesda Central Business District Sector Plan. In January 1986, WABA completed a feasibility study of the trail, and the next month advocates chose the name "Capital Crescent Trail."

The last train ran on the line in June 1985, when Chessie officials determined that one of its bridges was unsafe. At that time, the only customers were the General Services Administration, which used the railroad to bring coal to a heating plant at 29th and K streets, and a small building-supply company in Bethesda. Three months later, Chessie officials said that they would formally request ICC permission to abandon the line. Railroad officials said they were losing money on the line and that it detracted from the scenery around the Washington Harbor development, of which Chessie was a part owner. Local governments and the National Park Service began trying to acquire the land for a trail and transit corridor as early as 1985, when the ICC informed them that the National Trails System Act of 1968 could not be used to force Chessie to turn the land over. Problems with the line were exacerbated after the Potomac River flood in November undermined about 75 feet of roadbed near Fletcher's Boathouse. Before the abandonment, Chessie made plans to sell the section in the Palisades to a developer, and offered to sell it for $15 million. Chessie, by then part of the CSX Corporation, asked for permission to abandon the line in April 1986. The abandonment was completed in April 1988 and most of the track removed by the mid-1990s.

Advocates for turning the railroad into a trail, including the Greater Bethesda-Chevy Chase Coalition and the newly formed Coalition for the Capital Crescent Trail began to lobby local and federal officials to do so, putting together a Concept Plan in 1988.  Despite opposition from neighbors and those who wanted the right-of-way for mass transit, an excursion train, or other development, they convinced the Montgomery County government, along with a coalition of developers and government agencies, to purchase the right-of-way from the D.C. line to Silver Spring. Montgomery County purchased the right-of-way on December 16, 1988, four days after the ICC approved the purchase and transfer, under the Trails System Act. CSX sold the Maryland section of the line for $10.5 million. The following year, the Montgomery County Council voted to build a trolley and bike trail along the Bethesda-Silver Spring section of the right-of-way.

In December 1988, Kingdon Gould, Jr., purchased an option to buy the railroad right-of-way after failing to buy it outright for the purpose of restarting the railroad. However, once Montgomery County made a deal to buy their section of the trail, Gould placed the  section in the District of Columbia, between Georgetown and the D.C./Maryland boundary, into a trust until the National Park Service could purchase it outright for $10.5 million in 1990. The D.C. section then became a component of the Chesapeake and Ohio Canal National Historical Park. In 1991, advocates John Dugger and Henri Bartholomot helped secure federal funding through the Intermodal Surface Transportation Efficiency Act to develop the Maryland portion of the trail. The funding also paid for the D.C. portion and the rehabilitation of the Arizona Avenue Trestle.

Construction 
With the right-of-way and funding secured, work on the trail began in the early 1990s in four separate sections. In 1990, before any of the formal work began, volunteers built a wooden deck over the Arizona Avenue Railroad Bridge.  The groundbreaking for the trail was held on September 30, 1992, when Montgomery County leaders symbolically pried loose one of the railroad ties. Work began on the first section between Bethesda Avenue and Little Falls Parkway. That section, paid for by Montgomery County's departments of transportation and parks and by businessmen John Ourisman and Tom Miller, was cleared by PEPCO in exchange for easement considerations elsewhere and to reimburse the community after residents complained about power-line work on nearby Arlington Road. It became the first section to open when the ribbon was cut on March 30, 1994. Work on the portion in the District, from Dalecarlia Reservoir to Georgetown, except for the Arizona Avenue Trestle, started in 1993, finished in late 1994 and was performed by the National Park Service. That same year, Montgomery County, with financial assistance from Maryland and the federal government and planning from the Maryland-National Capital Park and Planning Commission, built the section from Little Falls Parkway to MacArthur Boulevard. The tracks were removed in the spring; the section was paved in the summer and completed by the end of the year. In late 1994 and early 1995, Arlington County built the section of the trail near Dalecarlia Reservoir from MacArthur to the District line, because they were doing unrelated work on pipelines in the area. In late 1995, the concrete deck of the Arizona Avenue trestle was poured, replacing the five-year-old wooden deck. In June 1996, the Arizona Avenue Trestle was opened, followed in November by the trail bridge over River Road. The last piece of the trail to be completed, the Dalecarlia Bridge, includes part of a bridge that took the Georgetown Branch over the Washington and Great Falls Electric Railway and it was designed to go over a road connecting two parts of the Washington Aqueduct reservation. The summer of 1996 saw the removal of the last three miles of track, from Silver Spring to Bethesda. In December, dedication ceremonies formally opened the River Road Bridge, the Dalecarlia Bridge, and the full Capital Crescent trail.

An unpaved trail connection to Norton Street NW and a staircase connection to Potomac Avenue NW were built after 1997 and before 2003. A plaza along River Road, named for Neal Potter, was opened on November 3, 2018. It has benches, stone sitting walls, a curving pathway, a red metal pergola, bike racks, a repair station, a display with trail information, and a plaque to honor Potter. The plaza was envisioned by architecture students at The Catholic University of America in 2006 and 2007. Their professor, Iris Miller, called the plaza "a tribute to persistence."

A second, 1,300-square-foot public plaza near Bethesda and Woodmont avenues, Ourisman Plaza, was constructed in 2019 as part of an agreement with an adjacent car dealership that had built a garage that encroached on the trail. As part of the deal, they also agreed to move their driveway farther from the trail's Bethesda Avenue entrance, to install decorative screening around the expanded garage to create a more appealing facade facing the trail, and to widen about a quarter-mile section of the trail about two feet to 16 feet.

The section from Bethesda to Silver Spring, meanwhile, was delayed due to continued debate over the proposed trolley.  It later opened as the Georgetown Branch Interim Trail. That section will be built as part of the work on the Purple Line.

Georgetown Branch Interim Trail 

The opening of the Bethesda-Silver Spring section was delayed by lawsuits and debate over what to do with it. A year after the right-of-way was purchased, Gov. William Donald Schaefer (D) offered $70 million to build a trolley line on it. Later, a combined transit/trail corridor was added to the county's master plan. This led to several battles between those who supported transit and those who did not, with those who supported a trail left in the middle. There were also lawsuits over the ownership of the line; adjacent homeowners, the Chevy Chase Land Co., and Columbia Country Club all sued the county. The county won all the suits and pursued construction of an interim trail while transit options were considered.

In 1995, the Montgomery County Council voted unanimously to fund the $390,000 Georgetown Branch Interim Trail on the section between the Wisconsin Avenue Tunnel and Kansas Avenue, but not on the trestle. Work began in early 1996 which involved pulling up the tracks and ties and then laying down a crushed stone surface. In June of that year the council voted to spend an additional $100,000, on top of $40,000 already appropriated, to build fences to separate the trail from the Columbia Country Club - over the objections of trail advocates. This eliminated the last barrier to the interim trail as the Country Club threatened a lawsuit if the Council did not agree to build the fence. Though the county-owned land was 100 feet wide, the fences would created a corridor 16-25 feet wide for 1/3 of a mile. At the same time they funded two golf cart crossings below the trail and bought land at Elm Park and Kansas Avenue needed to connect the trail.

On May 17, 1997, the Georgetown Branch Interim Trail from the east side of the Air Rights Tunnel in Bethesda to Stewart Avenue in Silver Spring opened. On August 15, 1998, the Air Rights Tunnel in Bethesda (built in 1910) was opened to trail traffic, connecting the interim and permanent sections. In June 2000, Montgomery County committed $1.3 million to repair the Rock Creek Trestle, which had been damaged by arson and fire, most notably in 1967, and open it for trail use. The trestle was dedicated for trail use on May 31, 2003.

Montgomery County began studying transit options for the corridor as early as 1986 and continued to study, litigate and debate it, until work began in 2017. A trolley between Bethesda and Silver Spring went through several iterations including the Georgetown Branch Light Rail Transit, the Inner Purple Line, the Bi-County Transitway and finally the Purple Line: a light rail train from Bethesda to New Carrollton, Maryland. Each iteration included plans to pave a parallel extension of the trail between Bethesda and Silver Spring and using the existing Air Rights Tunnel. However, in 2011 MTA announced that the cost of building the extended trail would be $103 million, much more than the previously estimated $65 million. Half of the cost would result from widening the Air Rights Tunnel to include the trail with the train. Instead, the county made plans for a second tunnel for the trail to run parallel to the transit tunnel and in part, under a new Air Rights building.

On September 5, 2017, the Georgetown Branch was closed so that work could begin on the Purple Line light rail. In conjunction with the Purple Line project, construction crews are extending the Capital Crescent Trail as a paved 12-foot wide off-road shared use path from Bethesda to Silver Spring. The Purple Line project, which was to be completed in 2022 when the trail was closed, has experienced many delays. By 2019, completion had slipped to 2023. After a contract dispute led to the project managers walking off the job, the state took over and claimed it could delay completion for years. In early 2022, the state announced that under a new proposed contract, the light rail would not be completed until 2026 nine months later, the opening was set for fall 2026. The trail could be opened before the trains run, but a tunnel through Bethesda will also not be completed until 2026.

Description
The currently closed section of the trail started at Lyttonsville Junction, about one mile (1.6 km) west of downtown Silver Spring. It went west on an unpaved, crushed-stone surface passing over Rock Creek on a trestle to Chevy Chase and then to Bethesda through the 800-foot-long Air Rights Tunnel. It was closed in September 2017 for construction of the Purple Line and the extension of the trail to Silver Spring. It will reopen around 2026 as a paved trail from Bethesda to Silver Spring.

The currently paved portion of the trail begins in downtown Bethesda, where the trail begins to turn south. It follows the Little Falls Branch to the Potomac River and the District line. It goes over the River Road Bridge and past the site of Fort Sumner, a Civil War-era fort. It then moves through the Dalecarlia area, traveling under the Washington Aqueduct conduit at the Dalecarlia Tunnel, past the Dalecarlia Reservoir and through the grounds of the Dalecarlia Treatment Plant over the Dalecarlia Bridge.

Crossing into Washington, D.C., it then turns southeast, dropping down from the Palisades neighborhood over the C&O Canal on the Arizona Avenue Railway Bridge, and down to the banks of the Potomac. It then runs between the Potomac and the C&O Canal, past Fletcher's Boathouse and the Foundry Branch Tunnel, into Georgetown to its terminus at the west end of Water Street NW.

See also
Metropolitan Branch Trail

References

External links

Coalition for the Capital Crescent Trail
Capital Crescent Trail — Montgomery Parks 
Capital Crescent Trail Map — Montgomery Park Trails
Google Map of Trail — Coalition for the Capital Crescent Trail

1996 establishments in the United States
Buildings and structures in the United States destroyed by arson
Protected areas of Montgomery County, Maryland
Rail trails in Maryland
Rail trails in Washington, D.C.
Transportation in Montgomery County, Maryland
Arson in Maryland
Bike paths in Maryland